Fullers may refer to:

 Fuller's Brewery, a British regional brewing company
Fuller, Smith & Turner, a British pub chain and former brewer
 Fullers Bridge, a bridge in Sydney
 Fullers Group, a ferry company in New Zealand

See also

 Fuller (disambiguation)